Hydrillodes morosa is a moth of the family Erebidae first described by Arthur Gardiner Butler in 1879. It is found in Sri Lanka, Myanmar and China-Korea border.

The caterpillar is known to feed on fresh, mature leaves of Litsea coreana.

The species has been used in experiments with insect teas.

References

External links
Yearly fluctuations of two most dominant moths, Hydrillodes morosa and Alcis angulifera in Mt. Jirisan
In vivo preventive effects of insect tea on buccal mucosa cancer in ICR mice
Preventive effect of insect tea against reserpine‑induced gastric ulcers in mice

Moths of Asia
Moths described in 1879
Herminiinae